Sundbybergs centrum (Sundbyberg Centre) is a metro station, located in Sundbyberg Municipality, approximately  from the centre of Stockholm. It opened on 19 August 1985 as part of the extension to between Västra skogen and Rinkeby. The metro station is connected to a stop on Tvärbanan with the same name, as well as to the railway station Sundbyberg served by the Stockholm commuter rail and long-distance trains.

Gallery

References

External links
Images of Sundbybergs centrum

Blue line (Stockholm metro) stations
Railway stations opened in 1985
1985 establishments in Sweden